Hunt the Man Down is a 1951 American crime film directed by George Archainbaud and starring Gig Young.

Plot
When loner Bill Jackson (James Anderson) prevents a robbery at the bar where he works, the ensuing media attention reveals that he is actually Richard Kinkaid, a fugitive wanted in connection with a 12-year-old murder case. Public defender Paul Bennett (Gig Young) believes that Kinkaid is innocent, but lacks fresh evidence to make his case. Now, with an innocent man's freedom in the balance, Bennett must find and interview the crime's original seven witnesses.

Cast

 Gig Young as Paul Bennett
 Lynne Roberts as Sally Clark
 Mary Anderson as Alice McGuire / Peggy Linden
 Willard Parker as Burnell 'Brick' Appleby
 Carla Balenda as Rolene Wood
 Gerald Mohr as Walter Long
 James Anderson as Richard Kincaid / William H. Jackson
 John Kellogg as Kerry 'Lefty' McGuire
 Harry Shannon as Wallace Bennett
 Cleo Moore as Pat Sheldon
 Christy Palmer as Mrs. Joan Brian

 Iris Adrian as Marie, McGuire's Neighbor (uncredited)
 Vince Barnett as Joe, Pool Player (uncredited) 
 Al Bridge as Ulysses Grant Sheldon (uncredited) 
 Frank Cady as Show Box Puppeteer (uncredited)
 Dick Elliott as Happy, Bar Owner (uncredited) 
 William Forrest as J.P. Knight, Public Defender (uncredited)
 Paul Frees as Packard 'Packy' Collins (uncredited)
 William Haade as Bart (uncredited) 
 Al Hill as Pete Floogle - Hit Man (uncredited)
 James Seay as Prosecutor (uncredited) 

Shown on the Turner Classic Movies show 'Noir Alley' with Eddie Muller on February 25, 2023.

References

External links
 
 
 
 

1951 crime films
1951 films
American crime films
American black-and-white films
Film noir
RKO Pictures films
Films directed by George Archainbaud
Films scored by Paul Sawtell
1950s English-language films
1950s American films